Ağoğlan (formerly known as Kosalar) is a village in the Lachin District of Azerbaijan, close to the village of Hüsülü. The Tsitsernavank Monastery is located near the village.

History
The village was located in the Armenian-occupied territories surrounding Nagorno-Karabakh, coming under the control of ethnic Armenian forces during the First Nagorno-Karabakh War in the early 1990s.

The village subsequently became part of the self-proclaimed Republic of Artsakh as part of its Kashatagh Province.

It was returned to Azerbaijan as part of the 2020 Nagorno-Karabakh ceasefire agreement.

References

External links 

Villages in Azerbaijan
Populated places in Lachin District